Ozark Actors Theatre is an Equity theater company in Rolla, Missouri founded in 1987 by pianist Gail Andrews-Hintz and founding Artistic Director F. Reed Brown with the help of actress Cindy Beger and her friend Kathy Pukas.  In 1993, The Cedar Street Playhouse became the home of Ozark Actors Theatre. Ozark Actors Theatre quickly gained a reputation for doing quality theatrical productions, and drew acclaim in Missouri and nationwide.  In 2010 Jason Cannon became the artistic director, and Pamela Reckamp took the position in 2015.

The only Equity theatre in the area, they have produced more than 100 shows and are affiliated with the Missouri Arts Council.

List of Shows

1988
 Godspell
 The Diviners
 Greater Tuna
 Magic to Do

1989
 Bernstein: Music of the Maestro
 I Do! I Do!
 Voices
 The Boys Next Door
 The Foreigner

1990
 Broadway: The Last 10 Years
 The Duck Variations
 Graceland
 Litko
 Savage Love
 Talley's Folly
 The House of Blue Leaves
 Lou Gehrig Did Not Die of Cancer
 Quilters
 A Christmas Carol
 The Actor's Nightmare

1991
 A Christmas Carol
 The Fantasticks
 Barefoot in the Park
 The Elephant Man
 The Songs of Stephen Sondheim
 The Voice of the Prairie

1992
 Nunsense
 The Golden Age of Broadway
 I Hate Hamlet
 Jazz at Castleman
 A Scent of Honeysuckle
 The Actor's Nightmare

1993
 Love Letters
 Nunsense II:  The Second Coming

1994
 Dames at Sea
 The Gifts of the Magi
 Marvin's Room
 Sea Horse
 Lend Me a Tenor

1995
 Abundance
 Smoke on the Mountain

1996
 In White America
 On the Air
 Cotton Patch Gospel
 The Golden Age of Entertainment
 The Nerd

1997
 A Command Performance
 Happy Birthday, You're Dead!
 Bye Bye Birdie
 Steel Magnolias

1998
 Big River
 All I Really Need to Know I Learned in Kindergarten
 Wedding Bell Blues

1999
 Aunt Tilly's Funeral
 The Music Man
 Driving Miss Daisy
 Little Shop of Horrors

2000
 Once Upon a Mattress
 Grace and Glorie
 To Kill a Mockingbird

2001
 Annie
 Art
 Arsenic and Old Lace
 The Best Christmas Pageant Ever

2002
 Oklahoma!
 You're a Good Man, Charlie Brown

2003
 Oliver!
 Always... Patsy Cline

2004
 Route 66: A Celebration of America's Mainstreet
 Fiddler on the Roof
 Wait Until Dark
 Nuncrackers

2005
 The Sound of Music
 Forever Plaid
 The Odd Couple
 A Christmas Survival Guide

2006
 Gypsy
 Musical Comedy Murders of 1940
 Joseph and the Amazing Technicolor Dreamcoat

2007
 Godspell
 Anything Goes
 Moon Over Buffalo
 Big: the musical
 White Christmas

2008
 Pump Boys and Dinettes
 The Music Man
 Altar Boyz
 It's a Wonderful Life

2009
 Daddy's Dyin': Who's Got the Will?
 Clue
 A Funny Thing Happened on the Way to the Forum
 Scrooge

2010
 The Mousetrap
 Annie
 The Fantasticks
 Babes in Toyland

2011
 Lend Me a Tenor
 The 25th Annual Putnam County Spelling Bee
 The Crucible
 White Christmas

2012
 25th Anniversary Gala
 The Wizard of Oz
 Noises Off
 The Diviners
 Follies
 Little Women

2013
 Peter Pan
 Fools
 Into the Woods
 Follies
 The Lion, the Witch and the Wardrobe

2014
 The Comedy of Errors
 Joseph and the Amazing Technicolor Dreamcoat
 The Drowsy Chaperone
 Follies
 Cabaret 1: Hannah Bagnall & Brittany Proia
 Cabaret 2: Blane Pressler & Maglione and Ruiz
 Cabaret 3: Alyssa Flowers & Jake Mills
 A Fairy Tale Christmas Carol

2015
 Meet Me in St. Louis
 The Importance of Being Earnest
 Lucky Stiff
 The Story of Velveteen Rabbit

External links

References

Regional theatre in the United States
Theatrical organizations in the United States
Arts organizations established in 1987
Organizations based in Missouri
1987 establishments in Missouri